Reel Life Productions, also known as Gothom Records, is an independent record label based in Detroit, Michigan most associated with the hip hop subgenre horrorcore. The label was founded in 1989 by James H. Smith and his younger brother, rapper Esham. Since its formation, RLP had released much of Esham's discography, and had been home to a number of other artists, including Natas, Dice, Mastamind, T-N-T, Kool Keith and The Dayton Family.

While the label was once cited as a vibrant example of independent success in Detroit hip hop, Reel Life Productions' peak in success occurred under distribution through TVT Records and an association with Overcore Records.

History

Establishment (1989–1997) 
James H. Smith founded the label in 1989 with his younger brother, Esham, a rapper. According to Esham, by the time he had started to rap, Detroit did not have a prominent hip hop scene. Smith states that "Everybody was just imitating what everybody else was doing". His older brother, James, encouraged him to seriously pursue a career as a rapper because of the city's limited hip hop scene. In 1989, Esham released his debut album, Boomin' Words from Hell. In 1990, Reel Life Productions reissued his debut album with an alternate track listing and artwork. Esham found it difficult to develop a fanbase, because many wrote off the dark content of his lyrics and imagery as shock value, while hip hop fans did not connect to Esham's albums because of his heavy metal influences.

Esham met Mastamind as a student at Osborne High School, who gave him a three-song demo tape of his music, leading the two to form the group with Esham's longtime friend, T-N-T, deciding on the name Natas, an acronym for "Nation Ahead of Time And Space". In 1991, Esham met Joseph Bruce, a member of the group Inner City Posse, who praised Esham and Reel Life Productions, and gave Esham a copy of the group's EP Dog Beats, beginning the two rappers' friendship and professional relationship.

In 1992, Natas released its first album, Life After Death on Reel Life. Following the release of this album, Esham, Natas and Reel Life Productions were the subject of much controversy when a 17-year-old fan killed himself while smoking cannabis and playing Russian roulette while listening to Life After Death.

In 1994, James was incarcerated for rape, leaving the future of Reel Life in doubt. In 1995, Reel Life began its association with the Detroit rapper Dice, who did not sign a contract with the label, but made appearances on albums by Esham, Natas and Mastamind. Reel Life released Dice's debut studio album, The Neighborhoodshittalka the following year. Dice left the label following the album's release, claiming that he received no royalties from his album, which he estimated to have sold 200,000 copies. Esham's album Dead Flowerz was the first RLP album to appear on a Billboard chart, peaking at #38 on Top R&B/Hip-Hop Albums. However, the label went bankrupt that year.

Rebranding as Gothom (1997–2001) 

In June 1997, Esham rebranded Reel Life Productions as Gothom Records, and released the album Bruce Wayne: Gothom City 1987, which charted at #57 on Top R&B/Hip-Hop Albums. Esham later signed a distribution deal with Overcore, a subsidiary of Overture Music, which later became distributed by TVT Records. Gothom signed the band 20 Dead Flower Children and released their album Candy, Toy Guns & Television on June 24, 1997. The following year, Gothom signed the rap metal band The Workhorse Movement, and released the band's EP Rhythm & Soul Cartel. The following year, Gothom announced that it would release The Workhorse Movement's debut album, Sons of the Pioneers, but the band left the label and signed with Roadrunner Records, which released the album in association with Overcore, with no involvement from Gothom.

In 2001, Gothom signed Kool Keith and The Dayton Family, and had its highest charting success with Dayton Family member Bootleg's solo release Hated By Many Loved By Few, which peaked at #174 on the Billboard 200, #6 on Independent Albums, and #38 on Top R&B/Hip-Hop Albums. Gothom achieved the most number of chart positions with Esham's Tongues, which peaked at #195 on the Billboard 200, #7 on Independent Albums, #46 on Top R&B/Hip-Hop Albums and #14 on Top Heatseekers. Tongues featured appearances by Kool Keith, The Dayton Family and Insane Clown Posse's Violent J. However, following this success, TVT and Overture went bankrupt, forcing Esham to fold RLP.

Psychopathic Records 

After RLP folded, Esham signed with Psychopathic Records, releasing two solo albums before leaving that label and reforming Reel Life Productions.

1st revival [2005–2011] 

Since leaving Psychopathic, however, Esham's only charting releases have been the mixtape The Butcher Shop, which peaked at #86 on Top R&B/Hip-Hop Albums, and Sacrificial Lambz, which peaked at #42 on Top R&B/Hip-Hop Albums and #50 on Top Heatseekers. In 2009, Esham and Natas performed at the Gathering of the Juggalos. Following the event, a friend of Esham's handed Joseph Bruce a copy of Esham's album I Ain't Cha Homey, which depicted a clown committing suicide with a gun on the front cover. Bruce listened to the album and saw it as a diss towards Insane Clown Posse. While Esham claimed that the album was not a diss in his podcast, the album strained the relationship between Bruce and Esham, and the two have not spoken since its release. In 2011, Gothom released the documentary Death of an Indie Label, which was originally announced as a bonus feature on a deluxe edition of DMT Sessions, but was instead uploaded onto Gothom Inc.'s YouTube channel./>

2nd revival [2013–present]
December 8, 2013 on his official Facebook. Esham posted a video announcing the relaunch of Reel Life Productions. Shortly after the video became popular the official website "Acidrap.com" closed with a banner saying "relaunching soon". That same day it was confirmed that the first official release on the newly relaunched Reel Life Productions would be a new Natas album. On May 17, 2014. Esham, Mastamind, and the official Natas Facebook's confirmed that the Natas reunion album "FUQERRBDY" would be released on July 15, 2014 revealing the track listing and the release of 2 promotional videos on Esham's official YouTube account.

Artists

 Current

 Former

References

External links 
 
Official podcast

 
American record labels
Hip hop record labels
Horrorcore record labels
Record labels established in 1989